War Brides is a Canadian television film, directed by Martin Lavut and broadcast by CBC Television in 1980. The film centres on four women, three from the United Kingdom and one from Germany, who come to Canada as war brides of Canadian soldiers after the end of World War II.

The film stars Elizabeth Richardson, Sonja Smits, Wendy Crewson and Sharry Flett as the women, and Geoffrey Bowes, Ken Pogue, Timothy Webber and Layne Coleman as their husbands.

The film was broadcast by CBC Television on September 20, 1980.

The film won four awards at the Bijou Awards in 1981 for Best Television Drama Over 30 Minutes, Best Art Direction (Barbara McLean), Best Cinematography in a Drama (Vic Sarin) and Best Editing in a Drama (Myrtle Virgo). It also received nominations for Best Actress in a Non-Feature (Flett), Best Director of a Drama (Lavut) and Best Screenplay (Grahame Woods). Woods won the ACTRA Award for Best Writing in a TV Drama.

References

External links

1980 films
1980 television films
Canadian drama television films
CBC Television original films
English-language Canadian films
Films directed by Martin Lavut
1980s Canadian films